The 1976 Boston College Eagles football team represented Boston College as an independent during the 1976 NCAA Division I football season. Led by ninth-year head coach Joe Yukica, the Eagles compiled a record of 8–3. Boston College opened the year with an upset win over No. 7 Texas, but accumulated three losses to unranked teams and failed to be invited to a bowl game. The team played home games at Alumni Stadium in Chestnut Hill, Massachusetts.

Schedule

References

Boston College
Boston College Eagles football seasons
Boston College Eagles football
Boston College Eagles football